Millwood Township may refer to the following townships in the United States:

 Millwood Township, Stearns County, Minnesota
 Millwood Township, Lincoln County, Missouri (inactive)
 Millwood Township, Guernsey County, Ohio